Clovis may refer to:

People
 Clovis (given name), the early medieval (Frankish) form of the name Louis
 Clovis I (c. 466 – 511), the first king of the Franks to unite all the Frankish tribes under one ruler
 Clovis II (c. 634 – c. 657), king of Neustria and Burgundy and first of the 
 Clovis III (reigned 675–676), king of Austrasia, considered a usurper by some
 Clovis IV (c. 677–694), boy king of the Franks from 691 until 694
 Clovis (died 580), son of Chilperic I and Audovera, assassinated by his father and stepmother
 Clóvis (footballer, born 1937), Clóvis Pinheiro dos Santos, Brazilian footballer
 Clóvis (footballer, born 1970), Clóvis Bento da Cruz, Brazilian football striker

Places
 Clovis, California
 Clovis Unified School District, serving Clovis and Fresno
 Clovis, New Mexico
 Clovis Municipal School District
 Clovis Municipal Airport

Archaeology
 Clovis culture, Paleo-Indian culture of North America
 Clovis point, the oldest flint tools associated with the North American Clovis culture
 Clovis comet, a hypothetical impact event around 12,800 years ago

Other
 Clovis Dardentor, 1896 fiction novel by French writer Jules Verne
 Clovis Sangrail, a character in the short stories of Saki, named because he was "so appallingly frank"
 Clovis, the main antagonist in the 1997 Blade Runner video game
 Clovis la Britannia, a character in the anime series Code Geass
 Clovis Crawfish the lead character in the book series Clovis the Crawfish
 Clovis Oncology, pharmaceutical company

See also
 Clovis High School (disambiguation)